Kałużna may refer to the following places in Poland:
Kałużna, Lower Silesian Voivodeship (south-west Poland)
Kałużna, West Pomeranian Voivodeship (north-west Poland)

See also
 
 Kalyuzhny